Patient relocation may refer to:
Care transition, between health care practitioners
Climatotherapy, relocation to another climate